Pravinsinh Natavarsinh Solanki is an Indian politician. He was elected to the Lok Sabha, the lower house of the Parliament of India.

References

External links
Official biographical sketch in Parliament of India website

Indian National Congress politicians from Gujarat
Indian National Congress (Organisation) politicians
1935 births
India MPs 1971–1977
Lok Sabha members from Gujarat
India MPs 1962–1967
India MPs 1967–1970
Living people
Swatantra Party politicians